The Costume Designers Guild Award for Excellence in Costume Design for Sci-Fi/Fantasy Television was awarded for the first time in 2018, for television airing the previous year. Previously, it honored both Fantasy/Sci-Fi series, in the category Excellence in Fantasy Television Series, and Period costuming together, with the award titled Costume Designers Guild Award for Excellence in Period/Fantasy Television Series.

Winners

1990s
Excellence in Period/Fantasy for Television

2000s

2010s

Excellence in Fantasy Television

Excellence in Sci-Fi/Fantasy Television

2020s

Programs with multiple awards

5 awards
 Game of Thrones (HBO)

2 awards
 Boardwalk Empire (HBO)
 Downton Abbey (PBS)
 Mad Men (AMC)
 Rome (HBO)
 Westworld (HBO)
|}

Programs with multiple nominations

8 nominations
 Game of Thrones (HBO)

5 nominations
 Boardwalk Empire (HBO)
 Mad Men (AMC)

4 nominations
 Once Upon a Time (ABC)
 Sleepy Hollow (Fox)
 That '70s Show (Fox)
 The Tudors (Showtime)

3 nominations
 Cold Case (CBS)
 Deadwood (HBO)
 The Handmaid's Tale (Hulu)

2 nominations
 The Borgias (Showtime)
 Carnivàle (HBO)
 Downton Abbey (PBS)
 Pushing Daisies (ABC)
 Rome (HBO)
 A Series of Unfortunate Events (Netflix)
 Star Trek: Discovery (CBS All Access)
 What We Do in the Shadows (FX)

References

Costume Designers Guild Awards